Coach Trip 2 was the second series of Coach Trip (a Channel 4 programme) that was filmed from May to July 2005 and aired from 22 May to 30 June 2006. This year the trip was centred on Mediterranean countries. Brendan returned as the tour guide, the narrator was once again Andy Love and the registration number plate once again was T100 MTT. Paul Donald was the driver for the first time.

Contestants

Voting history

Notes

The Trip Day-by-Day

References

2006 British television seasons
Coach Trip series
Television shows set in France
Television shows set in Gibraltar
Television shows set in Italy
Television shows set in Morocco
Television shows set in Portugal
Television shows set in Spain